WQBH-LP (102.9 FM, "WQBH Radio") is a radio station licensed to serve the community of St. Joseph, Michigan. The station is owned Marriage and Family Commitment, Inc., and airs a Christian radio format.

The station was assigned the WQBH-LP call letters by the Federal Communications Commission on March 14, 2014.

References

External links
 Official Website
 FCC Public Inspection File for WQBH-LP
 

QBH-LP
Radio stations established in 2015
2015 establishments in Michigan
QBH-LP
Berrien County, Michigan
Low-power FM radio stations in Michigan